Lindenhurst is a village in Suffolk County, New York, United States, on the southern shore of Long Island in the town of Babylon. The population was 27,253 at the 2010 census.

The village is officially known as the Incorporated Village of Lindenhurst.

Geography
Lindenhurst is located at  (40.685400, -73.372228).

Lindenhurst is bordered by Copiague to the west, North Amityville to the northwest, North Lindenhurst to the north, West Babylon to the east, and the Great South Bay to the south.

History
The village was originally named "Breslau" because the town's original German schrettlers were from the city of Breslau in Silesia (present-day Wrocław, Poland.) The town was founded in 1873 and renamed Lindenhurst in 1891.

On October 30, 2012, Hurricane Sandy flooded over half the village's streets. When multiple fires broke out south of Montauk Highway, firefighters were able to contain these fires to their respective dwellings limiting further damage to neighboring houses. Firefighters from most of the Town of Babylon helped control the fires in Lindenhurst. Firefighters fought the blazes in water that was four feet high in higher spots and six feet in lower areas. The people who lived on the northern side of Lindenhurst had no power for over one week. Because of incidents of looting the vacated homes on the southern side of Lindenhurst, the police force had to impose limitations. Curfews were enforced, and only people with proof of residency were allowed south of Montauk Highway. After two days, the water receded.

Notable people
Jack Barry, famous game show host; grew up in Lindenhurst; valedictorian at Lindenhurst High School
Joy Behar, co-host of The View; once a teacher at Lindenhurst High School
Pat Benatar, rock and roll singer; grew up in Lindenhurst and attended Lindenhurst Senior High School
Teddy Castellucci, Session Musician and Film Composer, with over 45 major Motion Pictures to his credit, many with Adam Sandler; grew up in Lindenhurst, graduated Lindenhurst High School.
Hal Hartley, film director; a Lindenhurst native
Ryan LaFlare, professional MMA fighter, UFC Welterweight division; born and raised in Lindenhurst
Dan Lauria, actor, The Wonder Years; resided in Lindenhurst
Billy Lawrence, writer; his novel The Punk and the Professor is based in Lindenhurst; a Lindenhurst High School graduate 
Joe Lhota, former New York City Deputy Mayor, MTA chairman and Republican mayoral candidate; born in the Bronx but grew up in Lindenhurst
Sal LoCascio, Hall of Fame Lacrosse goaltender and coach; attended Lindenhurst Senior High School
Eileen Moran, visual effects producer at Weta Digital and Digital Domain, co-producer of The Hobbit: An Unexpected Journey
Linda Morand, top international model; born in Lindenhurst
Doug Murray (comics), Co-creator and writer of the popular Marvel Comics series The 'Nam.  
Dustin Rinaldo, visual effects  Notable Law enforcement officer NBPDA and State of Connecticut, Former Professional Hockey player Canadian Hockey League

Demographics

As of the census of 2010, there were 27,253 people and 8,638 households in the village, with 3.17 persons per household. The population density was 7,248.1 people per square mile (2,864.3/km2).

There were 6,665 housing units, of which 15.1% were in multi-unit structures. The homeownership rate was 86.0%. The median value of owner-occupied housing units was $392,100. 3.6% of housing units were vacant and 20.7% of occupied housing units were occupied by renters.

The racial makeup of the village was 86.5% White, 3.3% African American, 0.1% Native American, 1.8% Asian, 0.0% Pacific Islander, 0.0% from other races, and 2.6% from two or more races. Hispanic or Latino people of any race were 18.1% of the population. The village was 82.9% non-Hispanic White.

There were 8,638 households, out of which 37.6% had children under the age of 18 living with them, 26.5% had individuals over the age of 65, 58.2% were married couples living together, 12.2% had a female householder with no husband present, and 24.4% were non-families. 19.3% of all households were made up of individuals, and 8.1% had someone living alone who was 65 years of age or older. The average household size was 2.92 and the average family size was 3.35.

In the village, the population was spread out, with 5.0% under the age of 5, 22.5% under the age of 18, 6.3% from 20 to 24, 26.1% from 25 to 44, 30.2% from 45 to 64, and 12.1% who were 65 years of age or older. The median age was 40.3 years.

95.2% of the population had lived in the same house one year and over. 13.0% of the entire population were foreign born and 16.1% of residents at least 5 years old spoke a language other than English at home.

88.3% of residents at least 25 years old had graduated from high school, and 21.2% of residents at least 25 years old had a bachelor's degree or higher. The mean travel time to work for workers aged 16 and over was 31.2 minutes.

The median income for a household in the village was $85,345. The per capita income for the village was $31,275. 2.9% of the population were below the poverty line.

Public schools
All of the Village of Lindenhurst is served by the Lindenhurst Union Free School District, which also serves most of North Lindenhurst and a small part of West Babylon.

As of the 2010-2011 school year, the Lindenhurst Union Free School District had 6,760 students. The racial demographics were 0% Native American or Alaska Native, 3% non-Hispanic black or African-American, 14% Hispanic or Latino, 80% non-Hispanic white, 3% Asian or Native Hawaiian/other Pacific Islander and 0% multiracial. 11% of students were eligible for free lunch, 5% for reduced-price lunch, and 4% of students were limited English proficient. 14.6% of students were classified as "special ed".

The school district had a graduation rate of 91%, and 1% of students did not complete school. 93% of graduates received a Regents Diploma and 54% received a Regents Diploma with Advanced Designation. Of the 2011 completers, 49% planned to move on to a four-year college, 29% to a two-year college, 0% to other post-secondary schooling, 1% to the military, 8% to employment, 2% to adult services, 0% had other known post-secondary plans, and 11% had no known post-secondary plan.

The district currently has:

Six elementary schools (grades K-5)(name) - (number of students) - (spot in Lindenhurst)
Albany Avenue - 470 students - North West
Alleghany Avenue - 300 students - South East
Daniel Street - 507 students - North East
Harding Avenue - 295 students - South South
West Gates Avenue - 321 students - South West
William Rall - 518 students - North North

One middle school (grades 6-8)
Lindenhurst Middle School

One high school (grades 9-12)
Lindenhurst Senior High School

For the 2011-2012 school year, the Accountability Status for all seven original elementary schools and the high school was "In Good Standing", while the middle school was "In Need of Improvement (Year 1) Basic". The overall Accountability Status for the district was "In Good Standing".

Edward W. Bower Elementary School ceased operating after the 2010-2011 school year due to the old age of the building and its low student population. Although Harding Avenue's student population was even lower at the time, its building is much newer. Although Bower has ceased operations as an elementary school, it now houses the Lindenhurst Academy.

See also
 Lindenhurst Memorial Library.

References

External links

Village of Lindenhurst official website
Lindenhurst Chamber of Commerce
Lindenhurst Schools official website

Babylon (town), New York
Villages in New York (state)
Villages in Suffolk County, New York
Populated coastal places in New York (state)